Pehlwani, (पहलवानी) also known as Kushti, is a form of wrestling contested in South Asia. It was developed in the Mughal Empire by combining Persian Koshti pahlevani with influences from native Indian Malla-yuddha. The words pehlwani and kushti derive from the Persian terms pahlavani (heroic) and koshti (wrestling, lit. killing) respectively, meaning Heroic wrestling. A practitioner of this sport is referred to as a pehlwan (Persian word for hero) while teachers are known as ustad (Persian word for teacher or master).

One of the most famous practitioners of Pehlwani was The Great Gama (Ghulam Mohammad Baksh Butt), who is considered one of the greatest wrestlers of all time. Kodi Rammurthy Naidu was another example. Brahmdev Mishra was also a great example of Indian wrestler who was known for his technique and physique not only in India but all over the world. Pehlwani is one among the sports that influenced catch wrestling, which in turn partially inspired folkstyle wrestling, freestyle wrestling, and mixed martial arts (MMA).

History 
The ancient Indian form of wrestling is called malla-yuddha. Practiced at least since the 5th millennium BC, described in the 13th century treatise Malla Purana, it was the precursor of modern Kushti.

In the 16th century, northern India was conquered by the Central Asian Mughals, who were of Turko-Mongol descent. Through the influence of Iranian and Mongolian wrestling, given time, the local malla-yuddha was supplanted by Persian Koshti. Interestingly, the aspects of Malla-yuddha survived in the culture of the Akhad (wrestling academy): Students are expected to be vegetarian, cook, take care of the facility, and be celibate. 

Babur, the first Mughal emperor, was a wrestler himself and could reportedly run very fast for a long distance while holding a man under each arm. Mughal-era wrestlers sometimes even wore bagh naka on one hand, in a variation called naki ka kushti or "claw wrestling".

During the late 17th century, Ramadasa  travelled the country encouraging Hindus to be physically active in homage to the great god Hanuman. Maratha rulers supported Kushti by offering large sums of prize money for tournament champions. It was said that every Maratha boy at the time could wrestle and even women took up the sport. During the colonial period, local princes sustained the popularity of kushti by hosting matches and competitions. Wrestling was the favourite spectator sport of the Rajputs, and were said to look forward to tournaments "with great anxiety". Every Rajput prince or chief had a number of wrestling champions to compete for his entertainment. The greatest wrestling centres were said to be Uttar Pradesh and the Panjab.

In 1909, a Bengali merchant named Abdul Jabbar Saudagar intended to unite the local youth and inspire them in the anti-British struggle against the colonists through a display of strength by holding a wrestling tournament. Known as Jabbar-er Boli Khela, this competition has continued through independence and the subsequent partition. It is still held in Bangladesh every Boishakhi Mela (Bengali new year), accompanied by playing of the traditional sanai (flute) and dabor (drum), and is one of Chittagong's oldest traditions.

In the more recent past, India had famous wrestlers of the class of the Great Gama (of British India and later Pakistan, after partition) and Gobar Goho. India reached its peak of glory in the IV Asian Games (later on called Jakarta Games) in 1962 when all the seven wrestlers were placed on the medal list and in between them they won 12 medals in freestyle wrestling and Greco-Roman wrestling. A repetition of this performance was witnessed again when all the 8 wrestlers sent to the Commonwealth Games held at Kingston, Jamaica had the distinction of getting medals for the country. During the 60s, India was ranked among the first eight or nine wrestling nations of the world and hosted the world wrestling championships in New Delhi in 1967.

Pehlwans who compete in wrestling nowadays are also known to cross train in the grappling aspects of judo and jujutsu. Legendary wrestlers from the bygone era like Karl Gotch have made tours to India to learn kushti and further hone their skills. The conditioning exercises of pehlwani have been incorporated into many of the conditioning aspects of both catch wrestling and shoot wrestling, along with their derivative systems.

Training

Regimen
Although wrestling in the Indian subcontinent saw changes in the Mughal era and the colonial period, the training regimen has remained the same for over 150 years. Fledgling wrestlers may start as early as 6, but most begin formal training in their teens. They are sent to an akhara or traditional wrestling school where they are put under the apprenticeship of the local guru. Their only training attire is the kowpeenam or loincloth.

Vyayam or physical training is meant to build strength and develop muscle bulk and flexibility. Exercises that employ the wrestler's own bodyweight include the Surya Namaskara, shirshasana, and the danda, which are also found in hatha yoga, as well as the bethak. Sawari (from Persian savâri, meaning "the passenger") is the practice of using another person's body weight to add resistance to such exercises.

Exercise regimens may employ the following weight training devices:
The nal is a hollow stone cylinder with a handle inside.
The gar nal (neck weight) is a circular stone ring worn around the neck to add resistance to danda and bethak.
The gada (mace) is a club associated with Hanuman. An exercise gada is a heavy round stone attached to the end of a meter-long bamboo stick. Trophies take the form of gada made of silver and gold.
Exercise regimens may also include  which involve twisting rotations, rope climbing, log pulling and running. Massage is regarded an integral part of a wrestler's exercise regimen.

A typical training day will go as follows:

 3 AM: Wake up and perform press-ups (danda) and squats (bethak), as many as 4000. Run for 5 miles, followed by swimming and lifting stone and sandbags.
 8 AM: Teachers watch as the trainees wrestle each other in earth pits continuously for 3 hours. This is around 25 matches in a row. Matches start with the senior wrestlers. The youngest go last.
 11 AM: Wrestlers are given an oil massage before resting.
 4 PM: After another massage, trainees wrestle each other for another 2 hours.
 8 PM: The wrestler goes to sleep.

Diet
According to the Samkhya school of Hindu philosophy, everything in the universe—including people, activities, and foods—can be sorted into three gunas: sattva (calm/good), rajas (passionate/active), and tamas (dull/lethargic).

As a vigorous activity, wrestling has an inherently rajasic nature, which pehlwan counteract through the consumption of sattvic foods. Milk and ghee are regarded as the most sattvic of foods and, along with almonds, constitute the holy trinity of the pehlwani khurak (from Persian خوراک پهلوانی khorâk-e pahlavâni), or diet. A common snack for pehlwan are chickpeas that have been sprouted overnight in water and seasoned with salt, pepper and lemon; the water in which the chickpeas were sprouted is also regarded as nutritious. Various articles in the Indian wrestling monthly Bharatiya Kushti have recommended the consumption of the following fruits: apples, wood-apples, bananas, figs, pomegranates, gooseberries, lemons, and watermelons. Orange juice and green vegetables are also recommended for their sattvic nature. Many pehlwan eat meat due to its high protein content. Famed pehlwan Dara Singh used to eat more than a pound of meat every day.

Ideally, wrestlers are supposed to avoid sour and excessively spiced foods such as chatni and achar as well as chaat. Mild seasoning with garlic, cumin, coriander, and turmeric is acceptable. The consumption of alcohol, tobacco, and paan is strongly discouraged.

Techniques
It has been said that most of the moves found in the wrestling forms of other countries are present in kushti, and some are unique to the Indian subcontinent. These are primarily locks, throws, pins, and submission holds. Unlike its ancient ancestor malla-yuddha, kushti does not permit strikes or kicks during a match. Among the most favoured manoeuvres are the dhobi paat (shoulder throw) and the kasauta (strangle pin). Other moves include the baharli, dhak, machli gota and the multani.

Rules

Wrestling competitions known as dangal or kushti, are held in villages and as such are variable and flexible. The area is either a circular or square shape, measuring at least fourteen feet across. Rather than using modern mats, South Asian wrestlers train and compete on dirt floors. Before training, the floor is raked of any pebbles or stones. Buttermilk, oil, and red ochre are sprinkled to the ground, giving the dirt its red hue. Water is added every few days to keep it at the right consistency; soft enough to avoid injury but hard enough so as not to impede the wrestlers' movements. Every match is preceded by the wrestlers throwing a few handfuls of dirt from the floor on themselves and their opponent as a form of blessing. Despite the marked boundaries of the arena, competitors may go outside the ring during a match with no penalty. There are no rounds but the length of every bout is specified beforehand, usually about 25–30 minutes. If both competitors agree, the length of the match may be extended. Match extensions are typically around 10–15 minutes. Unlike mat-based wrestling, there is no point scoring system; a win is achieved by pinning the opponent's shoulders and hips to the ground simultaneously, although victory by knockout, stoppage or submission is also possible. In some variations of the rules, only pinning the shoulders down is enough. Bouts are overseen by a referee inside the ring and a panel of two judges watching from the outside.

Titles

Official titles awarded to kushti champions are as follows. Note that the title Rustam is actually the name of an Iranian hero from the Shahnameh epic.

"Rustam-e-Hind": Champion of India. Dara Singh from Punjab, Sadika Gilgoo (Siddique Pehlwan), Krishan Kumar from Haryana, Muhammad Buta Pehlwan, Imam Baksh Pehlwan, Hamida Pehlwan, Vishnupant Nagrale, Dadu Chougule and Harishchandra Birajdar (Lion of India) from Maharashtra, Mangla Rai from Uttar Pradesh and Pehlwan Shamsher Singh (Punjab Police) held the Rustam-e-Hind title in the past. Vishnupant Nagrale was the first wrestler ever to hold this title.
Rustum-e-Pakistan: Also spelled as Rustum-i-Pakistan. Pakistan Champion.
Rustum-e-Punjab: Champion of Punjab, Pakistan.
"Maharashtra Kesari": Lion of Maharashtra. Maharashtra Kesari is an Indian-style wrestling championship. Narsinh Yadav (three-time winner)
"Rustam-e-Panjab" : (also spelled Rustam-i-Panjab) Champion of Panjab, India. Pehlwan Shamsher Singh (Punjab Police) Pehlwan Salwinder Singh Shinda was a six time Rustam-e-Panjab,.
"Rustam-e-Zamana": World Champion. The Great Gama became known as Rustam-e-Zamana when he defeated Stanislaus Zbyszko in 1910.
"Bharat-Kesari": Best heavyweight wrestler in Hindi. Recent winners include Chandra Prakash Mishra (Gama Pahalwan), Krishan Kumar(1986), Rajeev Tomar (Railways), Pehlwan Shamsher Singh (Punjab Police) and Palwinder Singh Cheema (Punjab police).
"Hind Kesari": Winner of 1969 Hind Kesari Harishchandra Birajdar (Maharashtra) (Lion of India); Winner of 2013 Hind Kesari, Amol Barate (Maharashtra); Winner of 2015 Hind Kesari, Sunil Salunkhe (Maharashtra)

See also

Akhara
Boli Khela
Gatka
Gatta Gusthi
Inbuan
Kabbadi
List of Pehlwani wrestlers
Malakhra
Malla-yuddha
Mongolian wrestling
Mukna
Pahlevani and zoorkhaneh rituals
Vajra-mushti
Wrestling in India
Wrestling in Pakistan
Pehlivan
Hyderabadi Pahalwan
History of physical training and fitness

References

External links
The Wrestler’s Body: Identity and Ideology in North India
Pakistan's pehlwans wrestle to survive
Pakistan Image Building: History of Kushti
Dara Singh In The Wrestling Observer Hall of Fame
Great Gama
Upper Crust: Badam-Doodh & Kolhapuri Kusti!
The Art of Pehlwani
Fighting Scene in Indian Cinemas

Wrestling in India
Wrestling in Pakistan
Folk wrestling styles
Traditional sports of India
Traditional sports of Pakistan
Sports originating in India
Sports originating in South Asia
Traditional sports of Bangladesh
Sindhi games